A diaper bag or nappy bag is a storage bag with many pocket-like spaces that is big enough to carry everything needed by someone taking care of a baby while taking a typical short outing.

These bags are not always designed expressly as a diaper bag, as any well-pocketed bag sized in between a child's school backpack and adult pro-camping backpack can be used for the purpose.  Some are now being made with rigid handles and wheels so that someone can cart one around, allowing that person to hold the baby more firmly, complete more tasks (like opening a door, paying a cashier, or using a phone), and reduce lower back pain.  My Child magazine suggests a brightly colored diaper bag is harder to lose and can help combat the "baby blues".

Diaper bags are generally small enough to fit on or under a stroller or buggy.  There have been fashion trends against large bags, as mothers learn to reduce the number of necessities carried.

In recent years, there has been an "explosion of styles, colors, designs, and functions." Diaper bags have helped fashion designers make their mark. Since 2005, some premium designers such as Kate Spade, Coach and Ralph Lauren have launched expensive diaper bag designs. According to Fortune in 2006, "To gain an edge, smart manufacturers are doing whatever it takes to capture the attention (and aesthetics) of today's chic parents-to-be who are willing - sometimes even eager - to pay top dollar for products that seamlessly blend fashion and function." Luxury diaper bags continue to be sold as of 2021.

Designers can be protective of their diaper bag designs and trademarks. In 1977, diaper bags were the cause of a New York court case between Macy's and Gucci. The court found that Macy's had infringed on Gucci's trademark by selling diaper bags with green and red bands and the wording "Gucchi Goo."

Designs without bright colors or licensed characters can be high-fashion items associated with celebrity mothers. Companies also produce diaper bags with a more rugged look, as part of a growing sector of the baby-products market designed to appeal to men.

See also
Ju-Ju-Be (brand)
Petunia Pickle Bottom

References

Babycare
Bags (fashion)
Diapers